My Best Friend Bob is a children's picture book written and illustrated by Georgie Ripper, first published in 2003. Brian and Bob are guinea pigs who live in a cage in Pete's Pet Palace. One day they are separated, when Bob is sold and suddenly taken away from the pet shop. Brian is inconsolable as he now has no-one to play I-Spy with, and even a peanut can't cheer him up. Misery sets in until he, too, is sold to the same owner as Bob, and the two guinea pigs are reunited in a touching final scene.

It was published in the United States under the title Brian and Bob: The Tale of Two Guinea Pigs.

Notes

2003 children's books
British children's books
British picture books
Children's fiction books
English-language books
Books about animals
Fictional cavies
Children's books about friendship